Yashodhara Katju (1928 – 1974) was a Bollywood actress who was  the Second Kashmiri  Girl after Shyama Zutshi who joined films in 1941. She was born in 1928 in Allahabad .

Early life, Career and Personal Life 
Yashodhara Katju was born on 15 April 1928 in Lahore. She was the daughter of Pandit Jeevan Lal  Katju who is a family member of Jaipur Katju family  Kamala Nehru too was a member of this family. At first they lived in Lucknow but later Pandit Jeevan Lal  Katju  was appointed as a senior  administrative officer by the British Government and transferred to the United Provinces. He then started to live in Lahore. Although he was transferred to Lucknow  but with the influence from  Pandit Jawaharlal Nehru  he later resigned  his government job and focused on Politics and freedom struggle. Yashodhara Katju was admitted to Convent of Jesus and Mary, Lahore. Yashodhara’s Mother's name was Kailashwati Mulla Katju who was the sister of Pandit Ananad Narain Mulla, the famous Kashmiri Urdu poet and the Judge of Allahabad High court. She was fluent in English, Gujarati, Marathi, Urdu, Kashmiri and Hindi. She was also proficient in horse Riding, singing (She was a student of   Bhatkhande Music Institute, Lucknow ) and dancing (  Kathakali, Kathak and Manipuri ) . Yashodhara Katju dreamed from her childhood to join films against the wishes of her family so she moved to Bombay in 1941. In 1941, she was offered a role in a movie named LALAJI produced by The National Studios. She was then only 14 years old. The movie was completed and released in 1942. Between LALAJI (1942) which was her first movie and DO PHOOL (1973) which was her last movie, she acted in about 85 films. She married Mr Bhandari a Naval officer Commander. After that she lived a very happy married life. Yashodhara Katju died in the year 1974 by a massive heart attack.

Filmography

References

External links
 

Indian film actresses
1928 births
1973 deaths